Common agrimony is a common name for several plants and may refer to:

Agrimonia eupatoria, native to Europe and introduced to North America
Agrimonia gryposepala, native to North America